The 27th Golden Globe Awards, honoring the best in film and television for 1969, were held on February 2, 1970.

Winners and nominees

Film

{| class="wikitable" style="width=100%"
! colspan="2" |Best Motion Picture
|-
! style="width=50%" |Drama
! style="width=50%" |Comedy or Musical
|-
| valign="top" |
Anne of the Thousand Days
Butch Cassidy and the Sundance Kid
Midnight Cowboy
The Prime of Miss Jean Brodie
They Shoot Horses, Don't They?
| valign="top" |
The Secret of Santa Vittoria
Cactus Flower
Goodbye, Columbus
Hello, Dolly!
Paint Your Wagon
|-
! colspan="2" |Best Performance in a Motion Picture – Drama
|-
!Actor
!Actress
|-
| valign="top" |
John Wayne - True Grit as Rooster Cogburn
Alan Arkin - Popi as Abraham "Popi" Rodriguez
Richard Burton - Anne of the Thousand Days as King Henry VIII
Dustin Hoffman - Midnight Cowboy as Enrico "Ratso" Rizzo
Jon Voight - Midnight Cowboy as Joe Buck
| valign="top" |
Geneviève Bujold - Anne of the Thousand Days as Anne Boleyn
Jane Fonda - They Shoot Horses, Don't They? as Gloria Beatty
Liza Minnelli - The Sterile Cuckoo as Pookie Adams
Jean Simmons - The Happy Ending as Mary Wilson
Maggie Smith - The Prime of Miss Jean Brodie as Jean Brodie
|-
! colspan="2" |Best Performance in a Motion Picture – Comedy or Musical
|-
!Actor
!Actress
|-
| valign="top" |
 Peter O'Toole - Goodbye, Mr. Chips as Arthur Chipping
Dustin Hoffman - John and Mary as John
Lee Marvin - Paint Your Wagon as Ben Rumson
Steve McQueen - The Reivers as Boom Hogganbeck
Anthony Quinn - The Secret of Santa Vittoria as Italo Bombolini
| valign="top" |
Patty Duke - Me, Natalie as Natalie Miller
Ingrid Bergman - Cactus Flower as Stephanie Dickinson
Dyan Cannon - Bob & Carol & Ted & Alice as Alice Henderson
Kim Darby - Generation as Doris Bolton Owen
Mia Farrow - John and Mary as Mary
Shirley MacLaine - Sweet Charity as Charity Hope Valentine
Anna Magnani - The Secret of Santa Vittoria as Rose Bombolini
Barbra Streisand - Hello, Dolly! as Dolly Levi
|-
! colspan="2" |Best Supporting Performance in a Motion Picture – Drama, Comedy or Musical
|-
!Supporting Actor
!Supporting Actress
|-
| valign="top" |
Gig Young - They Shoot Horses, Don't They? as Rocky
Red Buttons - They Shoot Horses, Don't They? as Sailor
Jack Nicholson - Easy Rider as George Hanson
Anthony Quayle - Anne of the Thousand Days as Cardinal Thomas Wolsey
Mitch Vogel - The Reivers as Lucius McCaslin
| valign="top" |
 Goldie Hawn - Cactus Flower as Toni Simmons
Marianne McAndrew - Hello, Dolly! as Irene Molloy
Siân Phillips - Goodbye, Mr. Chips as Ursula Mossbank
Brenda Vaccaro - Midnight Cowboy as Shirley
Susannah York - They Shoot Horses, Don't They? as Alice LeBlanc
|-
! colspan=2 | Other
|-
!Best Director
!Best Screenplay
|-
| valign="top" |
Charles Jarrott - Anne of the Thousand Days
Gene Kelly - Hello, Dolly!
Stanley Kramer - The Secret of Santa Vittoria
Sydney Pollack - They Shoot Horses, Don't They?
John Schlesinger - Midnight Cowboy
| valign="top" |
Anne of the Thousand Days - Bridget Boland, John Hale and Richard SokoloveButch Cassidy and the Sundance Kid - William Goldman
If It's Tuesday, This Must Be Belgium - David Shaw
John and Mary - John Mortimer
Midnight Cowboy - Waldo Salt
|-
!Best Original Score
!Best Original Song
|-
| valign="top" |Butch Cassidy and the Sundance Kid - Burt BacharachAnne of the Thousand Days - Georges Delerue
Goodbye, Mr. Chips - Leslie Bricusse
The Happy Ending- Michel Legrand
The Secret of Santa Vittoria- Ernest Gold
| valign="top" |"Jean" (Rod McKuen) - The Prime of Miss Jean Brodie
"Goodbye, Columbus" (The Association) -Goodbye, Columbus
"Raindrops Keep Falling on My Head" (Burt Bacharach, Hal David) - Butch Cassidy and the Sundance Kid
"Stay" (Ernest Gold, Norman Gimbel) - The Secret of Santa Vittoria
"True Grit" (Elmer Bernstein, Don Black) - True Grit
"What Are You Doing the Rest of Your Life?" (Michel Legrand, Alan and Marilyn Bergman) - The Happy Ending
|-
!Best Foreign Film (English Language)
!Best Foreign Film (Foreign Language)
|-
| valign="top" |
Oh! What a Lovely War (United Kingdom)The Assassination Bureau (United Kingdom)
If.... (United Kingdom)
The Italian Job (United Kingdom)
Mayerling (France)
| valign="top" | Z (Algeria)Ådalen 31 (Sweden)
The Big Dig (Israel)
Fellini Satyricon (Italy)
Girls in the Sun (Greece)
|-
!New Star of the Year – Actor
!New Star of the Year – Actress
|-
| valign="top" |Jon Voight - Midnight Cowboy as Joe BuckHelmut Berger - The Damned as Martin von Essenbeck
Glen Campbell - True Grit as La Boeuf
Michael Douglas - Hail, Hero! as Carl Dixon
George Lazenby - On Her Majesty's Secret Service as James Bond
| valign="top" |Ali MacGraw - Goodbye, Columbus as Brenda PatimkinDyan Cannon - Bob & Carol & Ted & Alice as Alice Henderson
Goldie Hawn - Cactus Flower as Toni Simmons
Marianne McAndrew - Hello, Dolly! as Irene Molloy
Brenda Vaccaro - Where It's At as Molly
|}

Other: Cecil B. Demille Award Joan CrawfordTelevision

Best Actor - Drama Series Mike Connors – Mannix
Peter Graves – Mission: Impossible
Lloyd Haynes – Room 222
Robert Wagner – It Takes a Thief
Robert Young – Marcus Welby, M.D.

Best Actress - Drama Series
 Linda Cristal – The High Chaparral
Amanda Blake – Gunsmoke
Peggy Lipton – The Mod Squad
Denise Nicholas – Room 222
Eleanor Parker – Bracken's World

Best Actor - Comedy or Musical Series
 Dan Dailey – The Governor & J.J.
Tom Jones – This Is Tom Jones
Jim Nabors – The Jim Nabors Hour
Dean Martin – The Dean Martin Show
Glen Campbell – The Glen Campbell Goodtime Hour

Best Actress - Comedy or Musical Series
 Carol Burnett – The Carol Burnett Show 
 Julie Sommars – The Governor & J.J.
Lucille Ball – Here's Lucy
Diahann Carroll – Julia
Barbara Eden – I Dream of Jeannie
Debbie Reynolds – The Debbie Reynolds Show

References
IMdb 1970 Golden Globe Awards

027
1969 film awards
1969 television awards
February 1970 events in the United States
1969 awards in the United States